The 15271 / 15272 Howrah–Muzaffarpur Jan Sadharan Express is an Express train belonging to Indian Railways East Central Railway zone that runs between  and  in India.

It operates as train number 15271  from Howrah Junction to Muzaffarpur Junction and as train number 15272 in the reverse direction, serving the states of West Bengal, Jharkhand & Bihar.

Coaches
The 15271 / 72 Howrah Junction–Muzaffarpur Junction Jan Sadharan Express has 17 general unreserved & two SLR (seating with luggage rake) coaches. It does not carry a pantry car.

As is customary with most train services in India, coach composition may be amended at the discretion of Indian Railways depending on demand.

Service

Routing

Traction
As the route is fully electrified, a Howrah-based WAP-7 electric locomotive powers the train for its entire journey.

References

External links
15271  Jan Sadharan Express at India Rail Info
15272 Jan Sadharan Express at India Rail Info

Transport in Muzaffarpur
Rail transport in Bihar
Rail transport in Jharkhand
Rail transport in West Bengal
Rail transport in Howrah
Jan Sadharan Express trains